Richard Riszdorfer (born 17 March 1981, in Komárno) is a Slovak sprint canoer who has competed since the late 1990s. Competing in three Summer Olympics, he won two medals in the K-4 1000 m event with a silver in 2008 and a bronze in 2004.

Riszdorfer has also won eleven medals at the ICF Canoe Sprint World Championships with six golds (K-4 500 m: 2002, 2003, 2006, 2007; K-4 1000 m: 2002, 2003), two silvers (K-4 200 m: 2009, K-4 1000 m: 2005), and three bronzes (K-4 500 m: 2001, K-4 1000 m: 2007, 2009).

Ricsi, the younger brother of teammate Michal, is a member of the ŠKP Bratislava club. He is 181 cm (5'11") tall and weighs 80 kg (176 lbs). He has been a scholarship holder with the Olympic Solidarity program since August 2002.

Personal life
Riszdorfer belongs to the Hungarian minority in Slovakia.

References

External links
 
 
 
 

1981 births
Canoeists at the 2000 Summer Olympics
Canoeists at the 2004 Summer Olympics
Canoeists at the 2008 Summer Olympics
Living people
Olympic canoeists of Slovakia
Olympic silver medalists for Slovakia
Olympic bronze medalists for Slovakia
Slovak male canoeists
Olympic medalists in canoeing
Hungarians in Slovakia
Sportspeople from Komárno
ICF Canoe Sprint World Championships medalists in kayak
Medalists at the 2008 Summer Olympics
Medalists at the 2004 Summer Olympics